Marketa Kimbrell (née Nitschová; August 1, 1928 – July 6, 2011) was a Czechoslovakian-born American actress and professor of acting and film directing.

In 1970, she and actor Richard Levy founded the New York Street Theater Caravan, a theater company which brought stage productions to audiences who otherwise might not have access to theater. Her target audiences included prisoners, coal mining towns, rural communities, Native American reservations, and low income inner city neighborhoods.

Personal life
Kimbrell was born near Prague in 1928 to Alfred and Josefina Nitsch. She wed an American Army major named George Kimbrell, whom she met at a refugee camp in Germany in 1945 following World War II. She moved to the United States with Kimbrell and was cast in stage, television shows and film. George Kimbrell died in 1952. She taught as a full-time professor of acting and film directing at the Tisch School of the Arts of New York University from 1970 until her retirement in 2006.

Death
Marketa Kimbrell died of complications from Alzheimer's disease on July 6, 2011, in Sykesville, Maryland, aged 82. She was survived by her two sons, seven grandchildren, one great-grandchild, and a sister.

Filmography

References

External links

1928 births
2011 deaths
American stage actresses
American television actresses
American film actresses
Tisch School of the Arts faculty
Czechoslovak emigrants to the United States
Czechoslovak refugees
Deaths from Alzheimer's disease
Neurological disease deaths in Maryland
Actresses from Prague